Pediasia siculella is a species of moth of the family Crambidae described by Philogène Auguste Joseph Duponchel in 1836. It is found in Sicily, Malta, Spain, Tunisia and Morocco.

References

Moths described in 1836
Crambini
Moths of Europe
Moths of Africa